Saryshaghan (Saryşağan) is a town in Kazakhstan located on the coast of Lake Balkhash at Latitude (DMS): 46° 7' 9 N Longitude (DMS): 73° 37' 9 E in Karaganda Region. Its population is estimated at 11,000 inhabitants.

Sary Shagan is a site of the major antiballistic missile defense test range in the Soviet Union. The first nonnuclear intercept of a ballistic missile warhead by a missile was accomplished there on 4 March 1961.

References 

Populated places in Karaganda Region